A perpetual calendar  is a calendar valid for many years, usually designed to look up the day of the week for a given date in the past or future.

For the Gregorian and Julian calendars, a perpetual calendar typically consists of one of three general variations:
 14 one-year calendars, plus a table to show which one-year calendar is to be used for any given year.  These one-year calendars divide evenly into two sets of seven calendars: seven for each common year (the year that does not have a February 29) with each of the seven starting on a different day of the week, and seven for each leap year, again with each one starting on a different day of the week, totaling fourteen. (See Dominical letter for one common naming scheme for the 14 calendars.)
 Seven (31-day) one-month calendars (or seven each of 28–31 day month lengths, for a total of 28) and one or more tables to show which calendar is used for any given month.  Some perpetual calendars' tables slide against each other so that aligning two scales with one another reveals the specific month calendar via a pointer or window mechanism. The seven calendars may be combined into one, either with 13 columns of which only seven are revealed, or with movable day-of-week names (as shown in the pocket perpetual calendar picture).
 A mixture of the above two variations - a one-year calendar in which the names of the months are fixed and the days of the week and dates are shown on movable pieces which can be swapped around as necessary. 
         
Such a perpetual calendar fails to indicate the dates of moveable feasts such as Easter, which are calculated based on a combination of events in the Tropical year and lunar cycles. These issues are dealt with in great detail in computus.

An early example of a perpetual calendar for practical use is found in the Nürnberger Handschrift GNM 3227a. The calendar covers the period of 1390–1495 (on which grounds the manuscript is dated to c. 1389). For each year of this period, it lists the number of weeks between Christmas day and Quinquagesima. This is the first known instance of a tabular form of perpetual calendar allowing the calculation of the moveable feasts that became popular during the 15th century.

Other uses of the term "perpetual calendar" 
Offices and retail establishments often display devices containing a set of elements to form all possible numbers from 1 through 31, as well as the names/abbreviations for the months and the days of the week, to show the current date for convenience of people who might be signing and dating documents such as checks.  Establishments that serve alcoholic beverages may use a variant that shows the current month and day but subtracting the legal age of alcohol consumption in years, indicating the latest legal birth date for alcohol purchases.  A common device consists of two cubes in a holder. One cube carries the digits zero to five. The other bears the digits 0, 1, 2, 6 (or 9 if inverted), 7, and 8. This is sufficient because only one and two may appear twice in date and they are on both cubes, while the 0 is on both cubes so that all single-digit dates can be shown in double-digit format.  In addition to the two cubes, three blocks, each as wide as the two cubes combined, and a third as tall and as deep, have the names of the months printed on their long faces.  The current month is turned forward on the front block, with the other two month blocks behind it.  

Certain calendar reforms have been labeled perpetual calendars because their dates are fixed on the same weekdays every year. Examples are The World Calendar, the International Fixed Calendar and the Pax Calendar. Technically, these are not perpetual calendars but perennial calendars. Their purpose, in part, is to eliminate the need for perpetual calendar tables, algorithms, and computation devices.

In watchmaking, "perpetual calendar" describes a calendar mechanism that correctly displays the date on the watch 'perpetually', taking into account the different lengths of the months as well as leap years. The internal mechanism will move the dial to the next day.

Algorithms 
Perpetual calendars use algorithms to compute the day of the week for any given year, month, and day of the month.  Even though the individual operations in the formulas can be very efficiently implemented in software, they are too complicated for most people to perform all of the arithmetic mentally. Perpetual calendar designers hide the complexity in tables to simplify their use.

A perpetual calendar employs a table for finding which of fourteen yearly calendars to use. A table for the Gregorian calendar expresses its 400-year grand cycle: 303 common years and 97 leap years total to 146,097 days, or exactly 20,871 weeks. This cycle breaks down into one 100-year period with 25 leap years, making 36,525 days, or one day less than 5,218 full weeks; and three 100-year periods with 24 leap years each, making 36,524 days, or two days less than 5,218 full weeks.

Within each 100-year block, the cyclic nature of the Gregorian calendar proceeds in the same fashion as its Julian predecessor:  A common year begins and ends on the same day of the week, so the following year will begin on the next successive day of the week.  A leap year has one more day, so the year following a leap year begins on the second day of the week after the leap year began.  Every four years, the starting weekday advances five days, so over a 28-year period, it advances 35, returning to the same place in both the leap year progression and the starting weekday.  This cycle completes three times in 84 years, leaving 16 years in the fourth, incomplete cycle of the century.

A major complicating factor in constructing a perpetual calendar algorithm is the peculiar and variable length of February, which was at one time the last month of the year, leaving the first 11 months March through January with a five-month repeating pattern: 31, 30, 31, 30, 31, ..., so that the offset from March of the starting day of the week for any month could be easily determined.  Zeller's congruence, a well-known algorithm for finding the day of the week for any date, explicitly defines January and February as the "13th" and "14th" months of the previous year to take advantage of this regularity, but the month-dependent calculation is still very complicated for mental arithmetic:

Instead, a table-based perpetual calendar provides a simple lookup mechanism to find offset for the day of the week for the first day of each month.  To simplify the table, in a leap year January and February must either be treated as a separate year or have extra entries in the month table:

Perpetual Julian and Gregorian calendar tables

Table one (cyd)
The following calendar works for any date from 15 October 1582 onwards, but only for Gregorian calendar dates.

Table two (cymd)

Table three (dmyc)

See also 
Determination of the day of the week
Doomsday rule
Long Now Foundation
Year 10,000 problem

References

External links

 Sliding Perpetual Calendar on one sheet of paper (U.S. version, PDF)
 Sliding Perpetual Calendar on one sheet of paper (non U.S. version, PDF)
 Conical or Pyramidal Year Calendar (with "First of March table", PDF)
 New Perpetual Calendar for any year
 Perpetual Calendar in JavaScript

Calendars